Stephan Casey (born 24 August 1993) is a Jamaican cricketer. He made his List A debut for Jamaica in the 2017–18 Regional Super50 on 18 February 2018.

References

External links
 

1993 births
Living people
Jamaican cricketers
Place of birth missing (living people)
Jamaica cricketers